Mylothris phileris is a butterfly in the family Pieridae. It is found in Madagascar. The habitat consists of forests.

References

Seitz, A. Die Gross-Schmetterlinge der Erde 13: Die Afrikanischen Tagfalter. Plate XIII 11

Butterflies described in 1833
Pierini
Endemic fauna of Madagascar
Butterflies of Africa